The 2017 Drake Bulldogs football team represented Drake University as a member of the Pioneer Football League (PFL) during 2017 NCAA Division I FCS football season. Led by fourth-year head coach Rick Fox, the Bulldogs compiled an overall record of 7–4 with a mark of 6–2 in conference play, placing second in the PFL. The team played its home games at Drake Stadium in Des Moines, Iowa.

Previous season 
The Bulldogs finished the 2016 season 7–4, 6–2 in PFL play to finish in third place.

Schedule

Game summaries

South Dakota

Southwestern (KS)

at South Dakota State

Valparaiso

at Butler

Dayton

at Marist

Davidson

at San Diego

at Campbell

Jacksonville

References

Drake
Drake Bulldogs football seasons
Drake Bulldogs football